Jim Jagielski (born March 11, 1961) is an American software engineer, who specializes in web, cloud and open source technologies.

Biography 
Jagielski graduated from the Johns Hopkins University in 1983 with a BES in Electrical/Computer Engineering. He was hired by NASA's Goddard Space Flight Center immediately after graduation.

In 1994, Jagielski founded jaguNET Access Services, a Web Host and ISP. He has served as CTO for Zend Technologies, CTO for Covalent Technologies, Chief Architect for SpringSource/VMware and under the Office of CTO at Red Hat, Inc. as a Consulting Software Engineer, and Sr. Director at Capital One in the Tech Fellows program. Currently he is the Open Source Chef at ConsenSys. He's been a speaker at various conferences and seminars such as ApacheCon, Forrester's IT Gigaworld, and O'Reilly Open Source Convention. He has written on numerous topics, and was the editor of the Apache section on Slashdot.

Career 
He is best known as cofounder, member, and director of The Apache Software Foundation (ASF) and as a core developer on several ASF projects, including the Apache HTTP Server, Apache Portable Runtime, and Apache Tomcat. His first recognition on the Internet was as editor of the A/UX FAQ and system administrator for Jagubox, the primary repository for third-party software for Apple's A/UX operating system.

In addition to his involvement with the ASF, Jagielski has been involved with other open-source projects.

Apache Software Foundation
Jagielski is one of the founding members of The Apache Software Foundation, after having been a member of the original eight-member Apache Group. Jagielski served as Director on the ASF's board from its incorporation in 1999, until 2018, making him the longest serving Director in the Foundation's history. After having served eight years as Executive Vice President and Secretary, and three years as Chairman, Jagielski served for several years as President of the ASF.

Jagielski is the original Chair of the Apache Incubator project, in which he is still involved. He was one of the original co-mentors for the Geronimo project, and he also mentors several Incubator podlings.

Jagielski is an active developer on many open source projects, ASF and otherwise. After doing some development on the NCSA HTTPd web server, he started with Apache in early-to-mid 1995, making him likely the longest active contributor within the ASF.

Software leadership
In 2005, Jagielski was asked to serve on the Advisory Board of the Open Source Software Institute. Open Source Software Institute (OSSI) is a non-profit (501 c 6) organization of corporate, government and academic representatives. Its mission is to promote the development and implementation of open-source software solutions within U.S. federal, state and municipal government agencies and academic entities.

In 2010, Jagielski was appointed to the Board of Directors of the CodePlex Foundation, which was later renamed to Outercurve Foundation. As well as Director, Jagielski serves as President for Outercurve.

In 2011, Jagielski was appointed to the Board of Directors of the Open Source Initiative. He resigned in September 2013.

Based on his long involvement in the FOSS community, Jagielski was one of the recipients of the O'Reilly Open Source Awards at OSCON 2012.

In 2012, Jagielski was appointed as a new Council member of the MARSEC-XL Foundation.

In 2015, Jagielski was awarded the European Commission/Open Innovation Strategy and Policy Group's Luminary Award in Creating Open Engagement Platforms for his global efforts in promoting Open Source as an Innovation process.

Other open software projects
Jagielski has contributed to Sendmail, xntpd, BIND, PHP, Perl and FreeBSD, among other projects.

References

External links
 

1961 births
A/UX people
Free software programmers
Living people
American software engineers
People from Dundalk, Maryland
Open source advocates
Members of the Open Source Initiative board of directors